Nogometni klub Križevci, commonly referred to as NK Križevci or simply Križevci, is a Croatian football club based in the town of Križevci.

External links
Soccerway profile

Football clubs in Croatia
Football clubs in Koprivnica-Križevci County
Association football clubs established in 1963
1963 establishments in Croatia